{{DISPLAYTITLE:C4H8N2O2}}
The molecular formula C4H8N2O2 (molar mass: 116.12 g/mol) may refer to:

 N-Acetylglycinamide
 Dimethylglyoxime
 HA-966

Molecular formulas